Alonzo Mario Stevenson, (born September 3, 1981) professionally known as Novel, is an American hip-hop/soul artist based in Los Angeles, California. He is a Grammy Award winning songwriter, singer, rapper and producer with also 5 Grammy nominations. He is the son of Motown's William "Mickey" Stevenson and the grandson of soul pioneer Solomon Burke.

Novel has collaborated with artists such as Lauryn Hill and Talib Kweli, and worked with other musicians including Royce Da 5'9', Joss Stone, David Guetta, India.Arie, Tweet, Stacie Orrico and Smokey Robinson and others. He has received over 5 Grammy nominations and 1 win in all different categories and is considered very versatile for writing & producing in the Pop genre, Alternative, Rock, Hiphop, R&B, even Jazz, Dance, Electronic, Including gospel, and currently working on country.

Biography
Alonzo Mario Stevenson was born in Los Angeles, California, son of William "Mickey" Stevenson, Motown singer/songwriter/producer and the label's first A&R executive, and Melanie Burke, a background singer for Chaka Khan. Stevenson, also the grandson of soul music pioneer Solomon Burke, grew up with his mother in Atlanta, Philadelphia, and North Carolina, sometimes staying in shelters because they had no money. A friend of Stevenson's in Philadelphia nicknamed him "Novel" because he always carried a notebook. After running away from home at age 14, Novel returned to California where his father set up a recording studio for him. 
He released a single, "Peach", on Rawkus Records in 2003. The video for the song features Smokey Robinson, a longtime family friend and Novel's godfather. 
Vibe called the song's melody "infectious" and Novel's vocals "seductive", but Novel almost didn't release the single because he "felt it was bubble gum". His debut album The Word was set to be released in 2003 but was ultimately cancelled when Rawkus split from MCA Records, which folded that year.

Novel spent the next several years writing and producing for other artists, including Alicia Keys, Beyoncé Knowles, India.Arie, Joss Stone, Kelis, and Leona Lewis. 
He signed to Dallas Austin's Rowdy Records in 2007 and released an EP, I Am... (Future Black President), the following year. The single "I Am", featuring Talib Kweli and Spree Wilson, contains a sample of the 2001 Ben Folds song "The Luckiest". Folds also provides pianos and vocals on the track. Novel's debut full-length album, The Audiobiography, was announced in early 2009. Spin wrote that Novel's "innate talents ooze" on the album and that it contains a "series of slinky funk jams", but it also "sounds a little too well-oiled at times". 
Novel wrote and featured on the David Guetta song, "Missing You", from Guetta's 2009 album One Love. The song peaked at number 85 on the French singles chart. 
Novel and rapper Joell Ortiz released a collaborative album, Defying the Predictable, in 2010.

Discography

Albums and EPs
 "Quality" Talib Kweli
 "Sound Bombing III"
 "Mr. Jones" Tom Jones
 "Diary Of A Mad Black Woman" Soundtrack 
 "A Beautiful Awakening" Stacie Orrico
 "Change" SugaBabes
 "Kelis Was Here" Kelis
 "Introducing Joss Stone" Joss Stone
 "Sammie" Sammie
 "8 Days A Weekend" Dallas Austin
 "Testimony Vol.2" India Arie
 "Love, Tweet" Tweet (Unreleased)
 "Spirit" Leona Lewis
 "I Am" Alicia Keys
 "The Hits" Lemar
 "Eyes For You" Esmee Denters & Justin Timberlake
 "Echo" Leona Lewis
 "One Love" David Guetta 
 "Back To Me" Fantasia
 "For True" Trombone Shorty
 "Slaughter House" Slaughter House
 "BraveHeart" Ashanti
 The Word (Cancelled) (2002, Rawkus/MCA)
 I Am (Future Black President) The EP (2008, Rowdy/Capitol)
 Calligraphy (TBA/2012, Lost Poets Music)
 Under Water, Overwhelmed (Currently on iTunes) (2012–13, Unsigned/Lost Poet) Entire Project Produced by Justin Kahler except for (A song For River Produced By Novel & Alex Naylor)
 Documentary 2 The Game (2015)
 Black In America (2016)
 Unreligious (2016, Independently)
 Goodbye August (2016, Independently)
 Dedication (2017,Independently) 
 No Dope On Sundays Cyhi Da Prince

Mixtapes
 Chapter One (2008)
 808's and Mixtapes (2009)
 Suspended Animation (2009)
 Defying the Predictable (with Joell Ortiz) (2010)
 Legato Blues Summer (2010)
 Grant Me Serenity (2011)
 Red Wine & Ambien (2012)
 Red Wine & Ambien ii (2014)

Production and writing

References

External links

Production and writing credits (partial list; via Allmusic) 

1981 births
American male rappers
American male singers
Record producers from California
Living people
Rappers from Los Angeles
Songwriters from California
21st-century American rappers
21st-century American male musicians
American male songwriters